John Vincent Frascatore (born February 4, 1970 in Ozone Park, New York), is a former professional baseball pitcher who pitched in the Major Leagues from 1994 to 2001. He played for the St. Louis Cardinals (1994–95, 1997–98), Arizona Diamondbacks (1999) and Toronto Blue Jays (1999–2001). In 274 games, Frascatore compiled a 20-17 record with 206 strikeouts and a 4.00 ERA.
In 1999 for the Toronto Blue Jays John tied a major league record by pitching in three consecutive days and recording three wins on those three days. He is known for his endurance and throughout his career he was never on the disabled list. In 2003 Frascatore retired and went overseas to Taiwan to pitch where he recorded a 1.80 ERA and won the award.

Frascatore was also the baseball director of Camp Wayne For Boys, located in Preston Park, Pennsylvania, from 2013 to 2018.

External links

1970 births
Living people
American expatriate baseball players in Canada
American expatriate baseball players in Taiwan
American people of Italian descent
Arizona Diamondbacks players
Arkansas Travelers players
Hamilton Redbirds players
Louisville Redbirds players
Major League Baseball pitchers
New Jersey Cardinals players
Savannah Cardinals players
Sportspeople from Queens, New York
Baseball players from New York City
Springfield Cardinals players
St. Louis Cardinals players
Syracuse SkyChiefs players
Toronto Blue Jays players
Uni-President Lions players